Vinny Paz (born Vincenzo Edward Pazienza, December 16, 1962), formerly Vinny Pazienza, is an American former professional boxer who held world titles at lightweight and light middleweight. The 2016 film Bleed for This is based on his comeback from a spinal injury.

Professional career
In the 1980s, Pazienza built a reputation along the East Coast, defeating such opponents as Melvin Paul (KO 2), Joe Frazier Jr. (TKO 7), Harry Arroyo (UD 10), Nelson Bolanos (TKO 6), and Roberto Elizondo (KO in 10). His first world title fight came on June 7, 1987, in Providence, Rhode Island, where he outpointed Greg Haugen over 15 rounds to become the IBF world lightweight champion. The pair would meet two more times: Haugen recovering the title in an immediate rematch, and Pazienza prevailing in a 10-round decision in their rubber match in 1990.

Pazienza failed in title tries in the junior welterweight division: in 1988, against WBC World Champion Roger Mayweather and in 1990, against both WBO Champion Hector "Macho" Camacho and WBA World Champion Loreto Garza.

In 1991, Pazienza moved into the junior middleweight division.  This movement was at the advice of his new trainer Kevin Rooney. In his first fight at junior middleweight, he won the USBA championship against Ron Amundsen in a 12-round decision. He defeated the WBA world jr. middleweight champion Gilbert Delé with a 12th-round TKO in Providence, becoming the second fighter in boxing history to win both the lightweight and junior middleweight world championships.

Pazienza was forced to relinquish the title due to a serious car accident in which his neck was broken. He was scheduled for a Jan.10 title defense against Pat Lawlor in Atlantic City but it was called off. Doctors informed him he might never walk again and would certainly never fight again. Pazienza had to wear a medical device called a Halo, a circular metal brace screwed into the skull in four spots and propped up with four metal rods. He had the Halo screwed to his skull for three months, during which time he maintained a workout regimen against doctors orders. He returned to the ring thirteen months after the accident and defeated future WBC world jr. middleweight champion Luis Santana by a 10-round decision.

After the Santana fight, Pazienza went on to defeat Brett Lally by a 6th-round TKO, and then, in another TKO, former world champion Lloyd Honeyghan in the 10th round. Pazienza went on to win the vacant IBO middleweight world title in 1993 with an 11th-round KO over Dan Sherry. Pazienza then went on to beat Roberto Durán twice, both via unanimous decision, with the IBC super middleweight title on the line both times. In the first fight, Durán put Pazienza down in Rounds 2 and 5, but referee Joe Cortez controversially ruled the Round 2 knockdown to be a slip. The first fight divided the people watching as some felt that Durán had won a close fight, but others felt that Pazienza had won either narrowly or widely after finishing strongly in the last five rounds. The second fight was more lopsided in Pazienza's favour, as despite the official judges giving Pazienza the win by scores of 116–112, 117–111 and 118–110, the TV commentators expressed puzzlement at the closeness of the official scoring as they thought that Pazienza had won every round in a 120–108 shutout.

In June 1995, Pazienza lost his world title bid against IBF world super middleweight champion Roy Jones Jr. In 1996, Pazienza inflicted then-prospect Dana Rosenblatt's only loss (a knockout in four rounds) to win the vacant WBU super middleweight world championship. 

In early 2001, Pazienza legally changed his last name to Paz. In 2002, he lost to WBC world super middleweight champion Eric Lucas in what would be his last shot at a world title. In 2004, Paz fought in his last fight, defeating Tocker Pudwill via 10-round unanimous decision. His record stands at 50–10, with 30 wins by knockout and five world titles (the IBF lightweight championship, WBA jr. middleweight championship, IBO super middleweight championship, IBC super middleweight championship, and the WBU super middleweight championship). He also won the USBA title.

Neck injury 
The driver of his car suffered a head injury and the driver of the oncoming car suffered minor injuries. Pazienza sued both drivers and was awarded $926,000, after the District Court for the District of Rhode Island ruled that the driver of the car in which Pazienza was a passenger was solely responsible for causing the accident.

Television/film appearances
Outside of boxing, Paz was a guest star on the TV series Police Academy, a guest on The Tonight Show with Jay Leno, was featured on The Montell Williams Show, served as a guest security guard on an episode of The Jerry Springer Show, and refereed the Brawl for All fight at WrestleMania XV between Bart Gunn and Butterbean. He appeared in the unreleased 1997 movie The Good Life.

The 2016 film Bleed for This is based on his comeback from a spinal injury, and stars Miles Teller as Pazienza.

Legal issues
Paz has been arrested on a variety of criminal charges, including alcohol-related crimes, domestic violence, passing bad checks, and disorderly conduct.

Professional boxing record

References

Bibliography

External links
Official website 

1962 births
Living people
American people of Italian descent
International Boxing Federation champions
World Boxing Association champions
Boxers from Rhode Island
Sportspeople from Cranston, Rhode Island
American male boxers
American male criminals
Lightweight boxers
American sportspeople convicted of crimes